Ban Phrao is a sub-district in the Nakhon Thai District of Phitsanulok Province, Thailand.

Geography
Ban Phrao lies in the Nan Basin, part of the Chao Phraya Watershed.

Administration
The following is a list of the subdistrict's muban (villages):

References

Tambon of Phitsanulok province
Populated places in Phitsanulok province